Cuculliinae is one of the larger subfamilies of moths in the family Noctuidae.

Genera

References